Mary Ogden Abbott (October 12, 1894 – May 11, 1981) was an American wood carving and line drawing artist, world traveler, equestrian and an early Grand Canyon River runner.

Early life
Mary Ogden Abbott was born in Concord, Massachusetts on October 12, 1894.  She was the daughter of Grafton St. Loe Abbott and Mary Ogden (née Adams) Abbott.

On her mother's side, she was a granddaughter of Charles Francis Adams Jr. and was a descendant of Presidents John Adams and John Quincy Adams. On her father's side, she was a granddaughter of U.S. Representative Josiah Gardner Abbott and was a descendant of George Abbott, one of the early settlers in Andover, Massachusetts.

Mary attended the Westover School in Connecticut and the School of the Museum of Fine Arts at Tufts in Boston, Mass.

Explorations

In 1920, Mary and her mother, Mary Adams Abbott, drove across the United States. That winter, the two women lived on the Arizona Strip at Ryan, Arizona. In the spring of 1921, Mary rode packstock across the Grand Canyon, crossing the Colorado River on a temporary suspension bridge near where the Black Suspension Bridge exists today. That same year the two women rode packstock from the Arizona Strip to the Bitterroot Valley of Montana.

From 1922 to 1927, the two women traveled to Java, Singapore, Hong Kong, Baghdad, Jerusalem, rode across Peloponnese on horseback, and made their way by automobile through Europe. These travels were recorded in journals and letters. Mary Ogden Abbott wrote her recollections of these adventures in the book Shikar in Baltistan, describing their hunting expedition in Baltistan in 1923, and "Improbable Interlude."

In 1948, Abbott made her first boat journey down the San Juan River to Lee's Ferry, Arizona, through Glen Canyon on the Colorado River. In 1949 she floated the Colorado River in Grand Canyon with Norman Nevills from Phantom Ranch to Lake Mead. In 1950, she ran the Colorado River in Grand Canyon from Lee's Ferry, Arizona, to Phantom Ranch, becoming the 114 person to make a complete transit of the Grand Canyon by boat. After the Nevills untimely death in 1949, Abbott designed a plaque to commemorate the lives of Norm and Doris Nevills. The plaque was placed at Navajo Bridge in 1952. Her plaque at Navajo Bridge was moved to its present location east of the visitor center after the new bridge was completed and the visitor area redesigned in 1995. Abbott joined river runner Otis R. Marston, Frank E. Masland, and National Park Service Chief of Interpretation John E. Doerr on a slickrock journey north of Navajo Mountain in September of 1957. In 1958, Abbott ran the Grand Canyon again by boat with Marston.

Artistry
Abbott was an accomplished artist in various media, especially woodcarving. She made the Reredos and altar for the Grace Episcopal Church (Lawrence, Massachusetts), and an altar depicting Saint George in cowboy attire in St. Andrew's Episcopal Church, Nogales, Arizona. Mary carved what she called the "Indian Gates," also known as the "western gates," two side by side teak doors, which were hung in the U.S. Department of the Interior building, Washington, D.C. These doors are always displayed in the open position.

Abbott's drawings appeared in the Appalachian Mountain Club journal Appalachia and books on travel. She was also a founding member of the Concord Art Association and served as its president from 1942 to 1971.  Abbott also provided the illustrations for George Cory Franklin's Wild Animals of the Five Rivers Country, published by Houghton Mifflin in 1947.  In its review, The New York Times wrote "Mary Abbott's spirited illustrations capture the lithe grace of these wild creatures in many of their tensest moments." Frank E. Masland commissioned Mary to paint a scene from river running in the Colorado river in Grand Canyon. After the painting was completed, Masland donated the painting to Grand Canyon National Park.

As a skilled equestrian, Abbott participated in hunts on the Alexander Higginson estate and with the Middlesex Hunt Club in South Lincoln, Mass. Abbott lived most of her life in Concord, Massachusetts.

Legacy
The Mary Ogden Abbott Papers are preserved at the Massachusetts Historical Society in Boston, Massachusetts.

References

External links
 

1894 births
1981 deaths
Abbott, Mary Ogden
Early Grand Canyon river runners
20th-century American women artists
People from Concord, Massachusetts
American woodcarvers
School of the Museum of Fine Arts at Tufts alumni
Women woodworkers